The Ripper Crew or the Chicago Rippers was a satanic cult and organized crime group composed of serial killers, cannibals, rapists, and necrophiles Robin Gecht and three associates: Edward Spreitzer, and brothers Andrew and Thomas Kokoraleis. They were suspected in the disappearances of 17 women in Illinois in 1981 and 1982, as well as the unrelated fatal shooting of a man in a random drive-by shooting. According to one of the detectives who investigated the case, Gecht "made Manson look like a Boy Scout."

Murders 

The gang's first victim was 28-year-old Linda Sutton, who was abducted on May 23, 1981. Ten days later, her body was found in a field in Villa Park, Illinois. Her body had been mutilated and her left breast amputated. It was almost a year before the gang struck again. On May 15, 1982, they abducted Lorraine Borowski, just as she was about to open the realtor's office where she worked. Her body was discovered five months later, in a cemetery in Clarendon Hills.

On May 29, they abducted Shui Mak from Hanover Park, a village northwest of Villa Park. Her body was not found for four months. Two weeks after they abducted Mak, they picked up Angel York in their van, handcuffed her and slashed her breast before throwing her out of the van, still alive. York's description of her attackers failed to produce any leads.

The gang did not strike again for two months.  On August 28, 1982, the body of Sandra Delaware was discovered on the bank of the Chicago River. She had been stabbed, strangled, and her left breast was amputated. On September 8, 31-year-old Rose Davis was found in an alley, having suffered almost identical injuries as Delaware.

On October 6, 1982, the gang shot 28-year-old Rafael Tirado, a local drug dealer, and his friend, 18-year-old Alberto Rosario, at a phone booth in a random drive-by shooting. According to Spreitzer, he was driving with Gecht when the older man told him to slow down. Gecht took two guns from the back of the car, told the Spreitzer to stop the car, and then opened fire on Tirado and Rosario, hitting both of them. Rosario survived his injuries, while Tirado succumbed to his injuries at a hospital. Tirado was the gang's only male victim.

A month later, the gang committed their last crime. Their victim, Beverley Washington, was found by a railroad track on December 6. In addition to other injuries, her left breast had been amputated and her right breast was severely slashed. She survived the attack, and was able to give descriptions of her attackers and the van they had used to abduct her.

The men were suspects in the disappearance of Carole Pappas, wife of Chicago Cubs pitcher Milt Pappas.  She disappeared on September 11, 1982.  Her body was recovered five years later, and the death was ruled an accident.

Arrest and convictions
When Gecht was first arrested, he had to be released since the police had insufficient evidence to connect him to the crimes. After further investigation, though, the police discovered that in 1981, he had rented a room in a motel along with three friends – each with adjoining rooms. The hotel manager said that they had held loud parties and appeared to be involved in some kind of cult. Police then tracked down the other men, Edward Spreitzer and the Kokoraleis brothers.

When interrogated, Thomas Kokoraleis confessed that he and the others had taken women back to Gecht's place – what Gecht called a "satanic chapel." There they had raped and tortured the women, and amputated their breasts with a wire garrote. Kokoraleis went on to say that they would eat parts of the severed breasts as kind of a sacrament, and that Gecht would masturbate into the breasts before putting them in a box. Kokoraleis claimed that he once saw 15 breasts in the box.

Gecht, the only member of the gang to maintain his innocence, was never tried for any of the murders due to a lack of evidence. In 1983, he was convicted of attempted murder, aggravated kidnapping, deviate sexual assaults, and rape for the non-fatal rape and assault of Beverly Washington. Gecht was sentenced to 120 years in prison. Before sentencing Gecht, Judge Francis J. Mahon told him "Only a devil would do these things. An animal would not do these things. A monster would." He pointed out that Gecht had left Washington for dead and was lucky to be not on trial for murder.

Gecht is serving his sentence at Menard Correctional Center. His projected parole date is October 10, 2042. Should he live long enough, Gecht will be 88 years old when he is released from prison.

In 1984, Spreitzer, in a bid for leniency, pleaded guilty to murder in the deaths of Shui Mak, Rose Davis, Sandra Delaware, and Rafael Tirado, as well as attempted murder, aggravated kidnapping, deviate sexual assault, and rape. He was sentenced to life in prison without parole.

In 1986, Spreitzer was convicted of murder and aggravated kidnapping in the death of Linda Sutton. The prosecution sought a death sentence. During the sentencing phase, Spreitzer's attorney, Carol Anfinson, argued he was "immature, impulsive and simplistic", and was following the orders of the gang's leader, Robin Gecht. She described him as a lonely person who would "do almost anything" to please his friend. The prosecution described Spreitzer as "every woman`s nightmare", calling the gang "cowardly weasels who roamed in packs to prey on women." Spreitzer was sentenced to death.

In 2003, Spreitzer's sentence was commuted to life in prison without parole after Governor George H. Ryan commuted the sentences of everyone on death row in Illinois. Incidentally, Andrew Kokoraleis was Governor Ryan's only execution, just over two months into his administration. Andrew was also the last inmate executed in Illinois, almost 12 years before Governor Pat Quinn signed legislation to abolish the death penalty on March 9, 2011, and commuted 15 death sentences to life imprisonment without parole.

In 1985, Andrew Kokoraleis was convicted of murder, aggravated kidnapping, and rape in the death of Rose Davis. The prosecution sought a death sentence. During the sentencing phase, Andrew's attorney said his client had been "a follower ... not an organizer, not the prime mover" in Davis's murder. The jury spared Andrew's life after deliberating for 90 minutes, and he was sentenced to life in prison without parole.

On March 18, 1987, Andrew was convicted of murder and aggravated kidnapping in the death of Lorraine Borowski. He was sentenced to death on April 30, 1987, and executed by lethal injection on March 17, 1999. He declined a last meal. Andrew's last words were "To the Borowski family, I am truly sorry for your loss. I mean this sincerely." He then cited verses from the biblical books of Exodus and Proverbs and added: "Repent ye, for the kingdom of heaven is at hand."

The Kokoraleis brothers were raised Greek Orthodox. The Orthodox Church attempted unsuccessfully to keep Andrew Kokoraleis from being executed. Demetrios Kantzavelos, at that time a chancellor (later a bishop) of the Greek Orthodox Metropolis of Chicago, became an anti-death-penalty activist as a result of the execution, and helped lobby in favor of ending the death penalty in the state.

Thomas Kokoraleis was convicted of murder and rape in the death of Lorraine Borowski. As a reward for his detailed confession, he was sentenced to life in prison without parole. On appeal, Thomas's rape conviction was reversed and he won a new trial on his murder conviction. Rather than face a retrial, Thomas pleaded guilty to Borowski's murder in exchange for a 70-year sentence. Charges in the murder of Linda Sutton were dismissed as part of the plea agreement. Thomas was scheduled to be paroled on September 30, 2017, but was denied release after he failed to find an approved place to live. He was released from prison on March 29, 2019. As of June 30, 2019, Thomas lives at Wayside Cross Ministries at 215 E. New York St. in Aurora, Illinois. In an interview with WBBM-TV, Thomas proclaimed his innocence, saying "Everybody thinks I’m a monster. I’m not a monster."

At the time of his arrest, Thomas Kokoraleis was a painter with no criminal record. He was described as having a "borderline range of intellect", with an IQ of 75.

David Gecht 
In March 1999, Robin Gecht's son, 18-year-old David Gecht, was charged with first degree murder for the gang-related killing of Roberto Cruz, 35, on January 29, 1999, in northwest Chicago. Two other men, 19-year-old Richard Kwil and 27-year-old Ruben Hernandez, were also charged.

David Gecht, the triggerman, was convicted of first degree murder and sentenced to 45 years in prison. He has a projected parole date of March 2, 2044.

Richard Kwil, a lookout, was convicted of first degree murder and sentenced to 30 years in prison. He has a projected parole date of March 1, 2029.

Ruben Hernandez, who planned and coordinated the shooting, was convicted of first degree murder and sentenced to 60 years in prison. He has a projected parole date of December 12, 2059.

All three men are serving their sentences at Pontiac Correctional Center. 

On May 25, 2022, David Gecht was granted a new trial. David Gecht was released on july 18, 2022, after the prosecution dismissed the case. The Gecht case was one of several on retrial after severe misconduct by former Chicago police detectives.

See also  
 Capital punishment in Illinois
 List of most recent executions by jurisdiction
 List of people executed in Illinois
 List of serial killers in the United States

References 

1981 in Illinois
1982 in Illinois
American cannibals
American people convicted of murder
American rapists
American serial killers
Crimes involving Satanism or the occult
Criminals from Chicago
Human trophy collecting
Male serial killers
Necrophiles
People convicted of murder by Illinois
Quartets
Torture in the United States
Violence against women in the United States